Aleksandr Kulakov may refer to:

Alexander Kulakov (born 1983), Belarusian ice hockey player
Aleksandrs Kulakovs (born 1956), Latvian footballer
Alexander Koulakov (born 1952), Kazakhstani football referee in 1997–98 Kazakhstan Cup Final